Barbara Mukambu Mbandi (died 1666) was the queen regnant of the Kingdom of Ndongo and Matamba from 1663 to 1666.  

She was the sister of queen Ana I Nzinga, who united the kingdoms of Ndongo and Matamba.  Her sister arranged for her to marry her general João Guterres Ngola Kanini, and appointed her as her designated heir and successor.  Barbara was taken captive by the Portuguese, and kept hostage during the negotiations between them and her sister.  In 1656, in connection to the release of Barbara from Portuguese custody in exchange for hundreds of slaves, Nzinga signed a peace treaty with the Portuguese and re-converted to Catholicism. After the death of Nzinga, Barbara succeeded her on the throne.  She and her spouse had to fight Njinga Mona for the throne in a civil war that did not end until their son succeeded to the throne in 1680.   

Issue 

 Francisco I Guterres Ngola Kanini, king in 1680-81
 Verónica I of Matamba, queen in 1681-1721

References 

 Anthony Appiah, Henry Louis Gates,  Encyclopedia of Africa, Volym 1
  From Eve to Dawn: A History of Women in the World Volume II
  Njinga of Angola
 Fernando Campos: Conflitos na dinastia Guterres através da sua cronologia1, África: Revista do Centro de Estudos Africanos. USP, S. Paulo, 27-28: 23-43, 2006/2007

17th-century monarchs in Africa
17th-century women rulers
African royalty
Converts to Roman Catholicism
Matamban and Ndongo monarchs
Women rulers in Africa
17th century in Angola